The 1933 World Archery Championships was the 3rd edition of the event. It was held at the Ranelagh Club in London, Great Britain from 31 July to 5 August 1933 and was organised by World Archery Federation (FITA).

It was the first time that separate men's and women's competitions were organised.

Medals summary

Recurve

Medals table

References

External links
 World Archery website
 Complete results

World Championship
World Archery
A
World Archery Championships
World Archery Championships
International archery competitions hosted by the United Kingdom